Tharagathi Gadhi Daati is an Indian Telugu-language teen comedy drama web series directed by Mallik Ram. A remake of The Viral Fever's Hindi-language web series Flames, the series is produced by Anurabh Kumar and has an ensemble cast of Harshith Reddy, Payal Radhakrishna, Nikhil Devadula and Snehal Kamat. First season of the series was premiered on 20 August 2021 on Aha. The title of the web series is inspired from the song of the same name from the soundtrack album of the 2020 film Colour Photo.

Synopsis

Cast 

 Harshith Reddy as Krishna "Kittu"
 Payal Radhakrishna as Jasmine Rao
 Nikhil Devadula as Ravi
 Snehal Kamat as Madhu
Vasu Inturi as father of Ravi
Ramana Bhargav as father of Krishna
Bindu Chandramouli as mother of Krishna
Ashwath
Mahendar
Jayavani
Laxmikala
Sujatha
Swapnika

Episodes

Soundtrack

Reception 
Thadhagath Pathi of The Times of India praised the narration and added that "The way Mallik connects a mathematical equation to life is hilarious and relatable. And that’s where all the logic lies!" Pinkvilla gave a rating of 2.5 out of 5. The critic wrote that "While the writing tries to bring out the insecurities of its characters, it doesn't quite rise above stock scenes. A beach date here, a cinema outing there. The treatment is also Gautham Menon-esque in the sense that Kittu is floored by Jasmine's beauty like a typical Menon hero."

Film Companion's Sankeertana Varma cited it as "a teenage romance with all the trappings of the genre, but none of the rewards". Rajitha Chanti of TV9 Telugu called it a "feel good love story".

References

External links 

 

2021 web series debuts
Telugu-language web series
Indian comedy web series
Indian drama web series
Indian teen drama television series
Aha (streaming service) original programming